Stargazer is a Lockheed L-1011 TriStar built in 1974, that was modified in 1994 for use by Orbital Sciences (now part of Northrop Grumman) as a mother ship launch pad for the Pegasus launch vehicle. , 45 rockets (containing nearly 100 satellites) have been launched from it, using the Pegasus-H and Pegasus-XL configurations. As of 2019, Stargazer is the only L-1011 airframe still airworthy.

History

The first Pegasus launch to use Stargazer was conducted on 27 June 1994 as the maiden flight of the Pegasus-XL. Previous launches used the NASA-operated Boeing NB-52B Balls 8, which was also used for four subsequent launches, as the original Pegasus could not be launched from Stargazer due to clearance issues. A modified version, the Pegasus-H, was introduced to rectify this.

Stargazer was also used for captive tests and transportation of the X-34 hypersonic research aircraft; however, drop tests used Balls 8. Orbital Sciences also offer the aircraft for research flights.

Pegasus launches using Stargazer are usually conducted from Vandenberg Air Force Base. Launches have also been conducted from the Cape Canaveral Air Force Station, the NASA Kennedy Space Center, the NASA Wallops Flight Facility and from launch sites outside the US: Kwajalein Atoll in the Marshall Islands and Gando Airport in Spain.

In 2010, Stargazer was reengined with -thrust Rolls-Royce RB211-524B4 turbofans to replace its original -thrust RB211-22Bs.

In 2015, Stargazer was repainted to reflect Orbital Sciences' merger with Alliant Techsystems.

On 15 December 2016, Stargazer successfully launched CYGNSS on behalf of NASA on its second attempt. The first attempt on 12 December was scrubbed due to issues with the hydraulic system responsible for separating the Pegasus rocket from the launch aircraft.

Stargazer appeared in Northrop Grumman livery in 2018 following the acquisition of Orbital ATK. Stargazer launched the Ionospheric Connection Explorer on 11 October 2019. The launch was originally scheduled for June 2017 but was scrubbed when an anomalous piece of vehicle data was observed during a ferry flight. The data was related to the rudder position of the Pegasus XL rocket and was observed during a routine in-flight vehicle health check. The launch was delayed multiple times from 2017 to 2019, finally occurring October 11, 2019.

Background
The Lockheed L-1011 TriStar carrier aircraft first flew in February 1974, and was delivered to Air Canada as C-FTNJ the following month. In May 1992 Orbital Sciences acquired the plane and had Marshall Aerospace in the UK implement accommodations for the Pegasus system. It was renamed for use as carrier aircraft for the Pegasus launch system. The company also considered other aircraft including the Boeing B-52G Stratofortress, Boeing 747, and DC-10, considering altitude and speed performance, range, modification complexity, as well as acquisition and operational costs.

See also

Scaled Composites White Knight
LauncherOne (Virgin Galactic Rocket)
Cosmic Girl (LauncherOne Carrier Plane)
Scaled Composites Stratolaunch

References

United States special-purpose aircraft
Lockheed aircraft
Individual aircraft
Rocket launch sites
Orbital Sciences Corporation
Aircraft related to spaceflight